Alexander Peter Ross (December 19, 1831 – October 18, 1915) was a politician in Ontario, Canada. He was a Conservative member of the Legislative Assembly of Ontario from 1883 to 1886 who represented the eastern riding of Cornwall.

He was born in Cornwall Township, Upper Canada in 1833. Ross was a lumber merchant and building contractor. He served on the town council and was mayor of Cornwall. He died in Cornwall in 1915.

References

External links 
The Canadian parliamentary companion, 1885 JA Gemmill

1833 births
1915 deaths
Mayors of Cornwall, Ontario
Progressive Conservative Party of Ontario MPPs